Enrique Baldwin (born 19 June 1909, date of death unknown) was a Peruvian sports shooter. He competed in the 300 m rifle event at the 1948 Summer Olympics.

References

1909 births
Year of death missing
Peruvian male sport shooters
Olympic shooters of Peru
Shooters at the 1948 Summer Olympics
Sportspeople from Callao
Pan American Games medalists in shooting
Pan American Games silver medalists for Peru
Pan American Games bronze medalists for Peru
Shooters at the 1951 Pan American Games
Medalists at the 1951 Pan American Games
20th-century Peruvian people